Kallepalli or Kallepalle is a village located around 5 kilometers from Srikakulam town in Andhra Pradesh, India.

River Nagavali meets the Bay of Bengal near the village Kallepalli.

In the 2011 census it had a population of 2459 in 609 households.

References

Villages in Srikakulam district